Michal Palkovic (born ) is a Slovak male weightlifter, who competed in the 56 kg category and represented Slovakia at international competitions. Palkovic has competed at various European Weightlifting Championships ranging from 2008 to 2016.

Major results

See also
 2016 European Weightlifting Championships

References

Further reading
 2012 European Weightlifting Championships 56 kg Class Results
 European Senior Championships 2009 
 2016 Ranking List Senior Men 56 Kg
 OlyStats.com

1985 births
Living people
Slovak male weightlifters
Place of birth missing (living people)